Parchhaiyan is an Indian television series that aired on Sahara TV. The series starred known television actors Achint Kaur and Milind Gunaji.

Cast
Achint Kaur as Archana
Milind Gunaji as Abhay

References

2002 Indian television series debuts
Indian drama television series
Sahara One original programming